Who Framed Roger Rabbit is a 1988 American fantasy comedy mystery film directed by Robert Zemeckis, and written by Jeffrey Price and Peter S. Seaman, based on Gary K. Wolf's 1981 novel Who Censored Roger Rabbit?. It stars Bob Hoskins, Christopher Lloyd, Stubby Kaye, and Joanna Cassidy, with the voices of Charles Fleischer and Kathleen Turner. Combining live-action and animation, the film is set in an alternate history Hollywood in 1947, where humans and cartoon characters (referred to as "toons") co-exist. It follows Eddie Valiant (Hoskins), a private investigator with a prejudice against toons who must help exonerate Roger Rabbit (voiced by Charles Fleischer), a toon framed for murder.

Walt Disney Pictures purchased the film rights for the story in 1981. Price and Seaman wrote two drafts of the script before Disney brought in executive producer Steven Spielberg and his production company, Amblin Entertainment. Zemeckis was brought on to direct and Canadian animator Richard Williams was hired to supervise the animation sequences. Production was moved from Los Angeles to Elstree Studios in England to accommodate Williams and his group of animators. While filming, the production budget began to rapidly expand, and the shooting schedule ran longer than expected.

The film was released through Disney's Touchstone Pictures banner on June 22, 1988. It received acclaim from critics, who praised its visuals, humor, writing, and performances, with critics and audiences considering it to be "groundbreaking". It grossed over $351 million worldwide, becoming the second-highest-grossing film of 1988. It brought a renewed interest in the golden age of American animation, spearheading modern American animation and the Disney Renaissance. It won three Academy Awards for Best Film Editing, Best Sound Effects Editing and Best Visual Effects and received a Special Achievement Academy Award for Williams' animation direction.

In 2016, the film was selected for preservation in the United States National Film Registry by the Library of Congress as "culturally, historically, or aesthetically significant".

Plot
Humans and cartoon characters, "toons", regularly interact in animated shorts and films, with toons residing in an area of Los Angeles known as Toontown. Private detective Eddie Valiant once worked closely with toons alongside his brother Teddy, but sank into depression and alcoholism after Teddy was murdered by a toon.

In 1947, R.K. Maroon, head of Maroon Cartoon Studios, is concerned about the recent poor performances of one of his stars, Roger Rabbit. Maroon hires Eddie to investigate rumors about Roger's voluptuous toon wife Jessica having an affair with Marvin Acme, owner of Acme Corporation and Toontown. After watching Jessica perform at a nightclub, Eddie secretly photographs her and Acme playing patty-cake, which he shows to Roger, who becomes distraught and despondent that his wife has been cheating on him.

The next morning Acme is discovered dead in his factory, and evidence suggests Roger killed him. While investigating Eddie meets Judge Doom, Toontown's sinister superior court judge, who uses a chemical substance known as "The Dip", capable of destroying the otherwise invulnerable toons. Eddie later runs into Roger's toon co-star, Baby Herman, who tells him that Roger is innocent and that Acme's missing will, which will give Toontown's ownership to the toons, may be the key to his murder. In his office, Eddie finds Roger, who begs him to help exonerate him. Eddie reluctantly hides Roger in a local bar, where his girlfriend Dolores works. Jessica approaches Eddie and says that Maroon forced her to pose for the photographs so he could blackmail Acme.

Doom and his toon weasel henchmen discover Roger, but he and Eddie escape with help from Benny, a toon taxicab. They flee to a theater, where Eddie tells Roger about the tragic loss of Teddy. As they leave with Dolores, Eddie sees a newsreel detailing the sale of Maroon Cartoons to Cloverleaf Industries, a mysterious corporation that bought the city's Pacific Electric transit system shortly before Acme's murder. Eddie goes to the studio to interrogate Maroon. Roger is sent to guard outside but he is kidnapped by Jessica. Maroon tells Eddie that he blackmailed Acme into selling his company so he could sell the studio, then admits he only did so out of fear for the safety of the toons. Maroon is then murdered by an unseen assailant before he can explain the consequences of the missing will. Eddie spots Jessica fleeing the scene, and assuming she is the culprit, follows her into Toontown. Once he finds her, Jessica reveals that it was Doom who killed Acme and Maroon and that the former gave her his will for safekeeping, but she soon discovered it was blank. Then she and Eddie are captured by Doom and the weasels.

At the Acme factory, Doom reveals himself as the sole shareholder of Cloverleaf Industries and explains his plot to destroy Toontown with a machine fueled with dip to build a freeway full of attractions in its place and force people to drive it once he has the transit system decommissioned to control all the profits. When Roger unsuccessfully attempts to save Jessica, the couple is tied onto a hook in front of the machine's water cannon. Eddie performs a comedic vaudeville act full of pratfalls, causing the weasels to die of laughter before he kicks their leader into the machine's dip vat, killing him. Eddie then fights Doom, who is flattened by a steamroller but survives, revealing himself as a disguised toon–and the one who killed Teddy. Eddie empties the machine's supply onto the factory floor, spraying it all over Doom and melting him to death.

The emptied machine then crashes through the wall into Toontown, where it is destroyed by a train. As the police and many dozens of toons gather at the scene, Eddie reveals Doom as Acme's murderer to everyone, clearing Roger's name. Eddie also discovers that Roger inadvertently wrote a love letter for Jessica on Acme's will, which was written in disappearing/reappearing ink, and Toontown's ownership is handed over to the toons. Having regained his sense of humor now that he has avenged Teddy, Eddie happily enters Toontown with Dolores alongside Roger, Jessica, and the other toons.

Cast

Live-action cast 

 Bob Hoskins as Eddie Valiant
 Christopher Lloyd as Judge Doom
 Corey Burton as Doom's toon voice (uncredited)
 Stubby Kaye as Marvin Acme
 Joanna Cassidy as Dolores
 Alan Tilvern as R.K. Maroon
 Richard LeParmentier as Lt. Santino
 Richard Ridings as Angelo
 Joel Silver as Raoul
 Paul Springer as Augie
 Mike Edmonds as Stretch

Voice cast 

 Charles Fleischer as Roger Rabbit, Benny the Cab, Greasy and Psycho
 Kathleen Turner (speaking voice) and Amy Irving (singing voice) as Jessica Rabbit (both uncredited)
 Lou Hirsch as Baby Herman
 David L. Lander as Smart Ass
 Fred Newman as Stupid
 June Foray as Wheezy and Lena Hyena
Mel Blanc as Bugs Bunny, Daffy Duck, Porky Pig, Tweety Bird, and Sylvester the Cat. The film was one of the final productions in which he voiced his Looney Tunes characters before his death a year later in 1989.
Joe Alaskey as Yosemite Sam
Wayne Allwine as Mickey Mouse
Tony Anselmo as Donald Duck
 Bill Farmer as Goofy and the Big Bad Wolf
Mae Questel as Betty Boop
Russi Taylor as Minnie Mouse and birds
Pat Buttram, Jim Cummings (imitating Andy Devine) and Jim Gallant (imitating Walter Brennan) as Eddie's toon bullets
Les Perkins as Mr. Toad
Mary T. Radford as Hyacinth Hippo, from Fantasia
Nancy Cartwright as the toon shoe
Cherry Davis as Woody Woodpecker
Peter Westy as Pinocchio
Richard Williams as Droopy
April Winchell as Mrs. Herman and Baby Herman's "baby noises"
Archival recordings of Frank Sinatra were used for the Singing Sword, whose character design is based on Sinatra.

Production

Development
Walt Disney Productions purchased the film rights to Gary K. Wolf's novel Who Censored Roger Rabbit? shortly after its publication in 1981. Ron W. Miller, then president of Disney, saw it as a perfect opportunity to produce a blockbuster. Jeffrey Price and Peter S. Seaman were hired to write the script, penning two drafts. Robert Zemeckis offered his services as director in 1982, but Disney declined as his two previous films (I Wanna Hold Your Hand and Used Cars) had been box-office bombs. Between 1981 and 1983 Disney developed test footage with Darrell Van Citters as animation director, Paul Reubens voicing Roger Rabbit, Peter Renaday as Eddie Valiant, and Russi Taylor as Jessica Rabbit. The project was revamped in 1985 by Michael Eisner, the then-new CEO of Disney. Amblin Entertainment, which consisted of Steven Spielberg, Frank Marshall and Kathleen Kennedy, were approached to produce Who Framed Roger Rabbit alongside Disney. The original budget was projected at $50 million, which Disney felt was too expensive.

The film was finally green-lit when the budget decreased to $30 million, which at the time would have still made it the most expensive animated film ever produced. Walt Disney Studios chairman Jeffrey Katzenberg argued that the hybrid of live-action and animation would "save" Walt Disney Feature Animation. Spielberg's contract included an extensive amount of creative control and a large percentage of the box-office profits. Disney kept all merchandising rights. Spielberg convinced Warner Bros., Fleischer Studios, Famous Studios, King Features Syndicate, Felix the Cat Productions, Turner Entertainment, and Universal Pictures/Walter Lantz Productions to "lend" their characters to appear in the film with (in some cases) stipulations on how those characters were portrayed; for example, Disney's Donald Duck and Warner Bros.' Daffy Duck appear as equally talented dueling pianists, and Mickey Mouse and Bugs Bunny also share a scene. Apart from the agreement, and some of the original voice artists reprising their roles, Warner Bros. and the various other companies were not involved in the production of Roger Rabbit. Executives at Warner Bros. were displeased by animators using the Daffy design by Bob Clampett and demanded they use the design by Chuck Jones; in response Zemeckis had separate artists animate Daffy using Jones' design to satisfy Warner Bros. to have Clampett's design in the final film. The producers were unable to acquire the rights to use Popeye, Tom and Jerry, Little Lulu, Casper, or the Terrytoons characters for appearances from their respective owners (King Features, Turner, Western Publishing, Harvey Comics, and Viacom).

Terry Gilliam was offered the chance to direct, but he found the project too technically challenging. ("Pure laziness on my part," he later admitted, "I completely regret that decision.") Robert Zemeckis was hired to direct in 1985, based on the success of Romancing the Stone and Back to the Future. Disney executives were continuing to suggest Darrell Van Citters direct the animation, but Spielberg and Zemeckis decided against it. Richard Williams was eventually hired to direct the animation. Zemeckis wanted the film to imbue "Disney's high quality of animation, Warner Bros.' characterization, and Tex Avery humor."

Casting
Harrison Ford was Spielberg's original choice to play Eddie Valiant, but his price was too high. Chevy Chase was the second choice, but he was not interested. Bill Murray was also considered for the role, but due to his idiosyncratic method of receiving offers for roles, Murray missed out on it. Eddie Murphy reportedly turned down the role as he misunderstood the concept of toons and humans co-existing; he later regretted this decision. Robin Williams, Robert Redford, Jack Nicholson, Sylvester Stallone, Edward James Olmos, Wallace Shawn, Ed Harris, Charles Grodin and Don Lane were also considered for the role. Ultimately Bob Hoskins was chosen by Spielberg because of his acting skill, and because Spielberg believed he had a hopeful demeanor and he looked like he belonged in that era. To facilitate Hoskins' performance, Charles Fleischer dressed in a Roger Rabbit costume and "stood in" behind camera for most scenes. Williams explained Roger was a combination of "Tex Avery's cashew nut-shaped head, the swatch of red hair... like Droopy's, Goofy's overalls, Porky Pig's bow tie, Mickey Mouse's gloves, and Bugs Bunny-like cheeks and ears."

Kathleen Turner provided the uncredited voice of Jessica Rabbit, Roger Rabbit's wife.

Tim Curry auditioned for the role of Judge Doom, but was rejected because the producers found him too terrifying. Christopher Lee was also considered for the role, but turned it down. John Cleese also expressed interest for the role, but was deemed not scary enough. Peter O'Toole, F. Murray Abraham, Roddy McDowall, Eddie Deezen and Sting were also considered for the role. Christopher Lloyd was cast because he previously worked with Zemeckis and Spielberg on Back to the Future. He compared his part as Doom to his previous role as the Klingon commander Kruge in Star Trek III: The Search for Spock, both overly evil characters which he considered "fun to play". He avoided blinking his eyes while on camera to portray the character.

Fleischer also voiced Benny the Cab, Psycho, and Greasy. Lou Hirsch, who voiced Baby Herman, was the original choice for Benny the Cab but was replaced by Fleischer.

Writing

Price and Seaman were brought aboard to continue writing the script once Spielberg and Zemeckis were hired. For inspiration, the two writers studied the work of Walt Disney and Warner Bros. Cartoons from the Golden Age of American animation, especially Tex Avery and Bob Clampett cartoons. The Cloverleaf streetcar subplot was inspired by Chinatown. Price and Seaman said that "the Red Car plot, suburb expansion, urban and political corruption really did happen," Price stated. "In Los Angeles, during the 1940s, car and tire companies teamed up against the Pacific Electric Railway system and bought them out of business. Where the freeway runs in Los Angeles is where the Red Car used to be." In Wolf's novel Who Censored Roger Rabbit?, the toons were comic-strip characters rather than movie stars.

During the writing process, Price and Seaman were unsure of whom to include as the villain in the plot. They wrote scripts that had either Jessica Rabbit or Baby Herman as the villain, but they made their final decision with the newly created character Judge Doom. Doom was supposed to have an animated vulture sit on his shoulder, but this was deleted due to the technical challenges this posed. Doom would also have a suitcase of 12 small, animated kangaroos that act as a jury, by having their joeys pop out of their pouches, each with letters, when put together would spell YOU ARE GUILTY. This was also cut for budget and technical reasons.

The Toon Patrol (Stupid, Smart Ass, Greasy, Wheezy, and Psycho) satirizes the Seven Dwarfs (Doc, Grumpy, Happy, Sleepy, Bashful, Sneezy, and Dopey), who appeared in Snow White and the Seven Dwarfs (1937). Originally seven weasels were to mimic the dwarfs complement, but eventually two of them, Slimey and Sleazy, were written out of the script. Further references included The "Ink and Paint Club" resembling the Harlem Cotton Club, while Zemeckis compared Judge Doom's invention of the Dip to eliminate all the toons as Hitler's Final Solution. Doom was originally the hunter who killed Bambi's mother. Benny the Cab was first conceived to be a Volkswagen Beetle before changed to a taxi cab. Ideas originally conceived for the story also included a sequence set at Marvin Acme's funeral, whose attendees included Eddie, Foghorn Leghorn, Mickey Mouse, Minnie Mouse, Tom and Jerry, Heckle and Jeckle, Chip n' Dale, Felix the Cat, Herman and Katnip, Mighty Mouse, Superman, Popeye, Olive Oyl, Bluto, Clarabelle Cow, Horace Horsecollar, the Seven Dwarfs, Baby Huey, and Casper the Friendly Ghost in cameo appearances. This scene was cut for pacing reasons at the storyboard stage. Before finally agreeing on Who Framed Roger Rabbit as the film's title, working titles included Murder in Toontown, Toons, Dead Toons Don't Pay Bills, The Toontown Trial, Trouble in Toontown, and Eddie Goes to Toontown.

Filming

Williams admitted he was "openly disdainful of the Disney bureaucracy" and refused to work in Los Angeles. Accommodating Williams and his animators, production moved to England where a studio, Walt Disney Animation UK (subsuming Richard Williams Animation), was created for this purpose; located at The Forum, 74-80 Camden Street, in Camden Town, London, while the live-action production was based at Elstree Studios. Disney and Spielberg also told Williams that in return for doing the film, they would help distribute his unfinished film The Thief and the Cobbler. Supervising animators included Van Citters, Dale Baer, Michael Peraza, Joe Ranft, Tom Sito, James Baxter, David Bowers, Andreas Deja, Mike Gabriel, Chris Jenkins, Phil Nibbelink, Nik Ranieri, Simon Wells, and Bruce W. Smith; Williams and associate producer Don Hahn spearheaded the animation production. The animation production was split between Walt Disney Animation UK and a specialized unit in Los Angeles, set up by Walt Disney Feature Animation and supervised by Baer. The production budget continued to escalate, while the shooting schedule ran longer than expected. When the budget reached $40 million, Disney CEO Michael Eisner seriously considered shutting down production, but studio chairman Jeffrey Katzenberg talked him out of it. Despite the budget escalating to over $50 million, Disney moved forward on production because they were enthusiastic to work with Spielberg.

VistaVision cameras installed with motion-control technology were used for the photography of the live-action scenes, which would be composited with animation. Rubber mannequins of Roger Rabbit, Baby Herman, and the Toon Patrol portrayed the animated characters during rehearsals to teach the actors where to look when acting with "open air and imaginative cartoon characters". Many of the live-action props held by cartoon characters were shot on set with the props either held by robotic arms or manipulated with strings, similar to a marionette.  For example, a test was shot at ILM with an actor playing the detective would climb down a fire escape and the rabbit is supposed to follow and he knocks down some stacked boxes. Naturally, there would not be a rabbit during the test, so the camera would go down the fire escape and the boxes would fall when a wire was pulled. The actor who played the voice of Roger, Charles Fleischer, insisted on wearing a Roger Rabbit costume while on the set, to get into character. Filming began on November 2, 1986, and lasted for seven and a half months at Elstree Studios, with an additional month in Los Angeles and at Industrial Light & Magic (ILM) for blue screen effects of Toontown. The entrance of Desilu Studios served as the fictional Maroon Cartoon Studio lot.

Animation and post-production
Post-production lasted for 14 months. ILM had already used CGI and digital compositing in a few movies, such as the stained glass knight scene in Young Sherlock Holmes, but the computers were still not powerful enough to make a complicated movie like Who Framed Roger Rabbit, so all the animation was done using cels and optical compositing. First, the animators and layout artists were given black-and-white printouts of the live-action scenes (known as "photostats"), and they placed their animation paper on top of them. The artists then drew the animated characters in relationship to the live-action footage. Due to Zemeckis' dynamic camera moves, the animators had to confront the challenge of ensuring the characters were not "slipping and slipping all over the place." Ensuring this did not happen and that the characters looked real, Zemeckis and Spielberg met for about an hour and a half and came up with an idea: "If the rabbit sits down in an old chair, dust comes up. He should always be touching something real." After the rough animation was complete, it was run through the normal process of traditional animation until the cels were shot on the rostrum camera with no background. Williams came up with the idea of making the cartoon characters “2.5-dimensional”, and the animated footage was sent to ILM for compositing, where technicians animated three lighting layers (shadows, highlights, and tone mattes) separately, to give the characters a sense of depth and create the illusion of them affected by the set lighting.. Finally, the lighting effects were optically composited on to the cartoon characters, who were, in turn, composited into the live-action footage. One of the most difficult effects in the film was Jessica's dress in the nightclub scene because it had to flash sequins, an effect accomplished by filtering light through a plastic bag scratched with steel wool.

Music

Regular Zemeckis collaborator Alan Silvestri composed the film score, performed by the London Symphony Orchestra (LSO) under the direction of Silvestri. Zemeckis joked that "the British [musicians] could not keep up with Silvestri's jazz tempo". The performances of the music themes written for Jessica Rabbit were entirely improvised by the LSO. The work of American composer Carl Stalling heavily influenced Silvestri's work on Who Framed Roger Rabbit. The film's soundtrack was originally released by Buena Vista Records on June 22, 1988, and reissued on CD on April 16, 2002.

On January 23, 2018, Intrada Records released a three-CD set with the complete score, alternates, and a remastered version of the original 1988 album, plus music from three Roger Rabbit short films, composed and conducted by Bruce Broughton and James Horner. Mondo Records and Walt Disney Records reissued the original 1998 album on vinyl on September 17, 2021.

The film features performances of "Hungarian Rhapsody" (Tony Anselmo and Mel Blanc), "Why Don't You Do Right?" (Amy Irving), "The Merry-Go-Round Broke Down" (Charles Fleischer), and "Smile, Darn Ya, Smile!" (Toon Chorus).

Release
Michael Eisner, then-CEO, and Roy E. Disney who was the vice chairman of The Walt Disney Company, felt the film was too risqué with adult themes and sexual references. Eisner and Zemeckis disagreed over various elements of it but since Zemeckis had final cut privilege, he refused to make alterations. Roy E. Disney, head of Feature Animation along with studio chief Jeffrey Katzenberg, felt it was appropriate to release the film under the studio's adult-orientated Touchstone Pictures banner instead of the flagship Walt Disney Pictures banner.

Box office 
The film opened in the United States on June 22, 1988, grossing $11,226,239 in 1,045 theaters during its opening weekend; it was in first place at the US box office. It was Disney's biggest opening weekend ever at the time of its release. It went on to gross $154,112,492 in the United States and Canada and $197,387,508 internationally, coming to a worldwide total of $351,500,000. At the time of release, it was the 20th-highest-grossing film of all time. It was also the second-highest-grossing film of 1988, behind only Rain Man. In the United Kingdom, the film also set a record opening for a Disney film.

Home media
The film was first released on VHS on October 12, 1989, and on DVD on September 28, 1999.

On March 25, 2003, Buena Vista Home Entertainment released it as a part of the "Vista Series" line in a two-disc collection with many extra features including a documentary, Behind the Ears: The True Story of Roger Rabbit; a deleted scene in which a pig's head is "tooned" onto Eddie's; the three Roger Rabbit shorts, Tummy Trouble, Roller Coaster Rabbit, and Trail Mix-Up; as well as a booklet and interactive games. The only short on the 2003 VHS release was Tummy Trouble. The 2003 DVD release presents the film in Full Screen (1.33:1) on Disc 1 and Widescreen (1.85:1) on Disc 2.

On March 12, 2013, the film was released by on Blu-ray and DVD combo pack special edition for the film's 25th anniversary. The film was also digitally restored for the release; frame-by-frame digital restoration was done by Prasad Studios removing dirt, tears, scratches, and other defects. Walt Disney Studios Home Entertainment released the film on Ultra HD Blu-ray on December 7, 2021.

Reception

Critical response
Who Framed Roger Rabbit received near-universal acclaim from critics, making Business Insiders "best comedy movies of all time, according to critics" list. The site's critical consensus reads, "Who Framed Roger Rabbit is an innovative and entertaining film that features a groundbreaking mix of live action and animation, with a touching and original story to boot." Aggregator Metacritic has calculated a weighted average score of 83 out of 100 based on 15 reviews, indicating "universal acclaim". Who Framed Roger Rabbit was placed on 43 critics' top ten lists, third to only The Thin Blue Line and Bull Durham in 1988. Audiences polled by CinemaScore gave the film an average grade of "A" on an A+ to F scale.

Roger Ebert of the Chicago Sun-Times gave the film four stars out of four, predicting it would carry "the type of word of mouth that money can't buy. This movie is not only great entertainment but [also] a breakthrough in craftsmanship." Gene Siskel of the Chicago Tribune praised the film's "dazzling, jaw-dropping opening four-minute sequence"; he noted that the sequence alone took nearly nine months to animate. Siskel gave the film three-and-a-half stars out of four. Ebert and his colleague Siskel spent a considerable amount of time in the Siskel & Ebert episode in which they reviewed the film analyzing its painstaking filmmaking. In evaluating their top ten films of the year, Siskel ranked it number two while Ebert ranked it as number eight. Janet Maslin of The New York Times commented that this is "a film whose best moments are so novel, so deliriously funny and so crazily unexpected that they truly must be seen to be believed." Desson Thomson of The Washington Post considered Roger Rabbit to be "a definitive collaboration of pure talent. Zemeckis had Walt Disney Pictures' enthusiastic backing, producer Steven Spielberg's pull, Warner Bros.'s blessing, Canadian animator Richard Williams' ink and paint, Mel Blanc's voice; Jeffrey Price and Peter S. Seaman's witty, frenetic screenplay; George Lucas' Industrial Light and Magic, and Bob Hoskins' comical performance as the burliest, shaggiest private eye." Gene Shalit on the Today Show also praised the film, calling it "one of the most extraordinary movies ever made". Filmsite.org called it "a technically-marvelous film" and a "landmark" that resulted from "unprecedented cooperation" between Warner Bros. and Disney. On CNN's 2019 miniseries The Movies, Tom Hanks called it the "most complicated movie ever made."

Richard Corliss, a writer for Time said, "The opening scene upstages the movie that emerges from it," he said. Corliss was mainly annoyed by the homages to the Golden Age of American animation. Chuck Jones made a rather scathing attack on the film in his book Chuck Jones Conversations. Among his complaints, Jones accused Zemeckis of robbing Richard Williams of any creative input and ruining the piano duel that both Williams and he storyboarded.

Accolades

Legacy

The critical and commercial success of the film rekindled an interest in the Golden Age of American animation, and sparked the modern animation scene, as well as the Disney Renaissance. It also has a cult following. In November 1988, a few months after the film's release, Roger Rabbit made his guest appearance in the live-action and animated television special broadcast on NBC called Mickey's 60th Birthday in which to celebrate the 60th anniversary of Mickey Mouse. In 1991, Walt Disney Imagineering began to develop Mickey's Toontown for Disneyland, based on the Toontown that appeared in the film. The attraction also features a ride called Roger Rabbit's Car Toon Spin. Three theatrical animated shorts were also produced: Tummy Trouble was shown before Honey, I Shrunk the Kids; Roller Coaster Rabbit was shown before Dick Tracy; and Trail Mix-Up was shown before A Far Off Place. The film also inspired a short-lived comic book and video game spin-offs, including two PC games, the Japanese version of The Bugs Bunny Crazy Castle (which features Roger instead of Bugs), a 1989 game released on the Nintendo Entertainment System, and a 1991 game released on the Game Boy.

In December 2016, the film was selected for preservation in the United States National Film Registry by the Library of Congress as "culturally, historically, or aesthetically significant".

The 2022 film Chip 'n Dale: Rescue Rangers was created as a spiritual sequel to Roger Rabbit, though combining several different animation techniques that have come about since Roger Rabbit. Roger also appears in a cameo in the film.

Controversies
With the film's LaserDisc release, Variety first reported in March 1994 that observers uncovered several scenes of antics from the animators that supposedly featured brief nudity of Jessica Rabbit. While undetectable when played at the usual rate of 24 film frames per second, the LaserDisc player allowed the viewer to advance frame-by-frame to uncover these visuals. Whether or not they were actually intended to depict the nudity of the character remains unknown. Many retailers said that within minutes of the LaserDisc debut, their entire inventory was sold out. The run was fueled by media reports about the controversy, including stories on CNN and various newspapers.

Another frequently debated scene includes one in which Baby Herman extends his middle finger as he passes under a woman's dress and re-emerges with drool on his lip. In the scene where Daffy Duck and Donald Duck are dueling on pianos, some heard Donald call Daffy a "goddamn stupid nigger", rather than the scripted  "doggone stubborn little".

Legal issue
Gary K. Wolf, author of the novel Who Censored Roger Rabbit?, filed a lawsuit in 2001 against The Walt Disney Company. He claimed he was owed royalties based on the value of "gross receipts" and merchandising sales. In 2002, the trial court in the case ruled that these only referred to actual cash receipts Disney collected and denied Wolf's claim. In its January 2004 ruling, the California Court of Appeal disagreed, finding that expert testimony introduced by Wolf regarding the customary use of "gross receipts" in the entertainment business could support a broader reading of the term. The ruling vacated the trial court's order in favor of Disney and remanded the case for further proceedings. In a March 2005 hearing, Wolf estimated he was owed $7 million. Disney's attorneys not only disputed the claim but also said Wolf owed Disney $500,000–$1 million because of an accounting error discovered in preparing for the lawsuit. Wolf won the decision in 2005, receiving between $180,000 and $400,000 in damages.

Proposed sequel
Spielberg discussed a sequel in 1989 with J. J. Abrams as writer and Zemeckis as producer. Abrams's outline was eventually abandoned. Nat Mauldin was hired to write a prequel titled Roger Rabbit: The Toon Platoon, set in 1941 to 1943. Similar to the previous film, Toon Platoon featured many cameo appearances by characters from The Golden Age of American Animation. It began with Roger Rabbit's early years, living on a farm in the midwestern United States. With human Ritchie Davenport, Roger travels west to seek his mother, in the process meeting Jessica Krupnick (his future wife), a struggling Hollywood actress. While Roger and Ritchie are enlisting in the Army, Jessica is kidnapped and forced to make pro-Nazi German broadcasts. Roger and Ritchie must save her by going into Nazi-occupied Europe accompanied by several other Toons in their Army platoon. After their triumph, Roger and Ritchie are given a Hollywood Boulevard parade, and Roger is finally reunited with his mother and father, Bugs Bunny.

Mauldin later retitled his script Who Discovered Roger Rabbit. Spielberg left the project when deciding he could not satirize Nazis after directing Schindler's List. Eisner commissioned a rewrite in 1997 with Sherri Stoner and Deanna Oliver. Although they kept Roger's search for his mother, Stoner and Oliver replaced the WWII subplot with Roger's inadvertent rise to stardom on Broadway and Hollywood. Disney was impressed and Alan Menken was hired to write five songs for the film and offered his services as executive producer. One of the songs, "This Only Happens in the Movies", was recorded in 2008 on the debut album of Broadway actress Kerry Butler. Eric Goldberg was set to be the new animation director, and began to redesign Roger's new character appearance.

Spielberg became busy establishing DreamWorks, while Frank Marshall and Kathleen Kennedy decided to remain as producers. Test footage for Who Discovered Roger Rabbit was shot sometime in 1998 at the Disney animation unit in Lake Buena Vista, Florida; the results were a mix of CGI, traditional animation, and live-action that did not please Disney. A second test had the toons completely converted to CGI, but this was dropped as the film's projected budget would escalate past $100 million. Eisner felt it was best to cancel the film. In March 2003, producer Don Hahn doubted a sequel, arguing that public tastes had changed since the 1990s with the rise of computer animation. "There was something very special about that time when animation was not as much in the forefront as it is now."

In December 2007, Marshall stated that he was still "open" to the idea, and in April 2009, Zemeckis revealed he was still interested. According to a 2009 MTV News story, Jeffrey Price and Peter S. Seaman were writing a new script for the project, and the animated characters would be in traditional two-dimensional, while the rest would be in motion capture. In 2010, Bob Hoskins had agreed to sign on for a sequel, but expressed scepticism about the use of "performance capture" in the film. Zemeckis said that the sequel would remain hand-drawn animated and live-action sequences will be filmed, just like in the original film, but the lighting effects on the cartoon characters and some of the props that the toons handle will be done digitally. Also in 2010, Hahn, who was the film's original associate producer, confirmed the sequel's development in an interview with Empire. He stated, "Yeah, I couldn't possibly comment. I deny completely, but yeah... if you're a fan, pretty soon you're going to be very, very, very happy." Hoskins retired from acting in 2012 after a Parkinson's disease diagnosis a year earlier, and died from pneumonia in 2014. Marshall confirmed that the film would be a prequel, similar to earlier drafts, and that the writing was almost complete. During an interview at the premiere of Flight, Zemeckis stated that the sequel was still possible, despite Hoskins' absence, and the script for the sequel was sent to Disney for approval from studio executives.

In February 2013, Gary K. Wolf, writer of the original novel, said Erik Von Wodtke and he were working on a development proposal for an animated Disney buddy comedy starring Mickey Mouse and Roger Rabbit called The Stooge, based on the 1952 film of the same name. The proposed film is set in a prequel, taking place five years before Who Framed Roger Rabbit and part of the story is about how Roger met Jessica. Wolf has stated the film is currently wending its way through Disney.

In November 2016, while promoting his film Allied in England, Zemeckis stated that the sequel "moves the story of Roger and Jessica Rabbit into the next few years of period film, moving on from film noir to the world of the 1950s". He also stated that the sequel would feature a "digital Bob Hoskins", as Eddie Valiant would return in "ghost form". While the director went on to state that the script is "terrific" and the film would still use hand-drawn animation, Zemeckis thinks that the chances of Disney green-lighting the sequel are "slim". As he explained more in detail, "The current corporate Disney culture has no interest in Roger, and they certainly don't like Jessica at all". In December 2018, while promoting Welcome to Marwen, his latest film, and given the 30th anniversary of Who Framed Roger Rabbit, Zemeckis reiterated in an interview with Yahoo! Movies that though the sequel's script is "wonderful", Disney is still unlikely to ever produce it, and he does not see the possibility of producing it as an original film for the streaming service Disney+, as he feels that it does not make any sense as there is no "Princess" in it.

Notes

References

Further reading

External links

Who Framed Roger Rabbit essay  by Alexis Ainsworth at National Film Registry

 
1988 films
1980s English-language films
1988 animated films
1988 comedy films
1980s American animated films
1980s crime comedy films
American crime comedy films
American crossover films
American films with live action and animation
American detective films
Metafictional works
Self-reflexive films
Postmodern films
Surreal comedy films
Looney Tunes films
Bugs Bunny films
Daffy Duck films
Elmer Fudd films
Foghorn Leghorn films
Marvin the Martian films
Porky Pig films
Ralph Wolf and Sam Sheepdog films
Speedy Gonzales films
Sylvester the Cat films
Tweety films
Yosemite Sam films
Mickey Mouse films
Donald Duck films
Goofy (Disney) films
Betty Boop
Droopy
Animated films about rabbits and hares
Films about weasels
Films about babies
BAFTA winners (films)
Comedy crossover films
Disney controversies
Films about animation
Films about films
Films about Hollywood, Los Angeles
Films about murder
Films adapted into comics
Films based on American novels
Films set in 1947
Films set in Los Angeles
Films set in studio lots
Films shot in Hertfordshire
Films shot in Los Angeles
Films shot in California
Film controversies
Rotoscoped films
Amblin Entertainment films
Amblin Entertainment animated films
Films shot at EMI-Elstree Studios
Obscenity controversies in animation
Obscenity controversies in film
Touchstone Pictures films
Touchstone Pictures animated films
Films that won the Best Sound Editing Academy Award
Films that won the Best Visual Effects Academy Award
Films whose editor won the Best Film Editing Academy Award
Hugo Award for Best Dramatic Presentation winning works
Films scored by Alan Silvestri
Films directed by Robert Zemeckis
Films produced by Frank Marshall
Films with screenplays by Jeffrey Price and Peter S. Seaman
United States National Film Registry films
Animated crime films
Animated crossover films